Holy Comforter Episcopal School is a private, Episcopal, coed school in Tallahassee, Florida, located on about  of land in Leon County, Florida, about 7 miles (10 km) northeast of the state capitol building in Tallahassee, FL.

History
Holy Comforter Episcopal School began with the arrival of Father Frank Pisani in the Spring of 1955. Upon completing a Theological Seminary in Alexandria, Va; Warren served as rector at Holy Comforter Episcopal Church in Tallahassee. The school began as a kindergarten held in the basement of the Holy Comforter parish with 25 children and one instructor. Since then, the school has grown to incorporate grades PreK - 8, with a student body of about 548 students. Holy Comforter Episcopal School is accredited by the Southern Association of Colleges and Schools (SACS), the Florida Council of Independent Schools (FCIS), the Florida Kindergarten Council (FKC), Southern Association of Independent Schools (SAIS), and the Board of Regents of the Episcopal Diocese of Florida.

Students 
Approximately 550 students are enrolled annually at the school, which includes all grades from Pre-K through 8. There are 50 teaching faculty and guidance counselors at Holy Comforter Episcopal School.

References 

Private middle schools in Florida
Private elementary schools in Florida
Preparatory schools in Florida
Schools in Tallahassee, Florida